This article lists events that occurred during 1970 in Estonia.

Incumbents

Events
Introduction of universal secondary education. The result was rapid decline of the quality of education.

Births

Deaths

References

 
1970s in Estonia
Estonia
Estonia
Years of the 20th century in Estonia